Laura Woods may refer to:

 Laura Woods (English presenter) (born 1987), English presenter for Sky Sports
 Laura Woods (Irish presenter) (born 1977), Irish presenter
 Laura J. Woods (born 1961), Colorado state senator